Orara is a historical town and Union Council of Kasur District in the Punjab province of Pakistan.Before Partition, Orara fell under the Lahore District and Tehsil Kasur. The village was largely populated with Dhillon Jatts, predominantly Sikhs who have now settled in East Punjab.  It is part of Kasur Tehsil and is located at 31°12'1N 74°21'44E with an altitude of 194 metres (639 feet).

References

Kasur District